The Yardymly meteorite (also known as Aroos meteorite,  or Ərus meteoriti) is an iron meteorite that fell in Yardymli Rayon, Azerbaijan on November 24, 1959. The remains were discovered in the nearby village of Aroos. The meteorite is kept in the Institute of Geology of Azerbaijan National Academy of Sciences. According to the director of Şamaxı Astrophysical Observatory Eyub Guliyev, the Yardymli meteorite may originate from the shower of Perseids.

The eyewitnesses saw the bright bolide flying through clouds from southwest to northeast. The falling was accompanied by a bright, blinding flare brighter than solar illumination and a noise similar to rolling thunder. The illumination embraced the area of ca. . The fall of individual pieces was accompanied by a whistling and drone, resembling that produced by a jet aircraft or missile. The examination of chemical and physical properties of the meteorite was led by  Azeri researcher Mirali Qashqai. The meteorite features a sizeable Widmanstätten pattern and an anomalously low amount of tritium. Similar tritium anomalies were detected previously in other iron meteorites.

At the request of American scientists, the Soviet Meteorite Committee sent the meteorite samples to California University, Cambridge Astrophysical Observatory and the Institute for Nuclear Researches of Chicago University, as well as to CERN. One of the samples was preserved in Fersman Mineralogical Museum.

Individual pieces
In order of discovery:
1st 
2nd 
3rd 
4th 
5th

See also
 Glossary of meteoritics

Notes

Meteorites found in Azerbaijan
Iron meteorites
Yardimli District
1959 in the Soviet Union
Soviet Union–United States relations